Qitai County as the official romanized name, also transliterated from Uyghur as Guqung County or Gucheng County, is a county in the Xinjiang Uyghur Autonomous Region of China under the administration of the Changji Hui Autonomous Prefecture.

Qitai County's county seat is in Qitai Town. Gucheng Township is nearby.

History
Located on one of the main routes of the Silk Road, the old Gucheng (often referred in the European writing of the past as "Ku Ch'eng-tze", Kucheng, Kuchengtze, etc., using Wade-Giles or Postal Romanization systems), was the western terminal for one of the caravan routes across the Gobi Desert. Owen Lattimore in The Desert Road to Turkestan leaves an account of his travel along this route in 1926-27.
"Under the special circumstances of the caravan trade, camel traffic usually overshoots Hami [“the most easterly point on the arterial cart roads of Chinese Turkestan”], going on all the way to Ku Ch’eng-tze. This is partly because the pastures near Ku Ch’eng-tze are more adequate to caravan needs, but still more because, transport being cheaper by camel than by cart, it is to the advantage of merchants to have their goods carried as far as possible by caravan."

Climate

Transportation
In 2009, the Ürümqi–Dzungaria Railway was constructed through the Jiangjun Gobi desert in the northern part of the county. It terminates at a coal mine in Jiangjunmiao.

The radio telescope project

In 2012, the officials of the Chinese Academy of Sciences and the Xinjiang government presided over the groundbreaking at the site of the Xinjiang Qitai Astronomical and Science Education Base. 
The facility, in Qitai County's Banjiegou Town (半截沟镇), will be the home of the proposed Qitai Radio Telescope. Once completed it will be the largest fully steerable single-dish radio telescope in the world.

Footnotes

References
 Lattimore, Owen (1929). The Desert Road to Turkestan. Owen Lattimore. Boston, Little, Brown, and Company. Reprinted with new introduction, 1972, AMS Press, New York, N.Y.

County-level divisions of Xinjiang
Changji Hui Autonomous Prefecture